Sayak Chakraborty (born 27 September 1994) is a Bengali actor who works in Bengali cinema. He is known for his portrayal as Krishna in the TV serial Mahaprabhu Sri Chaitanya, a mythological show, and Karunamoyee Rani Rashmoni a historical drama show which airs on Zee Bangla. He has also appeared in Belashuru, a family drama film directed by Nandita Roy.

Career 
Chakraborty performed  as a junior artist, from  2006 to 2013, in various Bengali TV serials and films. 

He is known for his portrayal as Krishna in the TV serial Mahaprabhu Sri Chaitanya, a mythological show, and Karunamoyee Rani Rashmoni a historical drama show which airs on Zee Bangla. He worked in 18 consecutive TV serials as supporting cast. He has also worked in films such as Bawali Unlimited (2012) and The Light: Swami Vivekananda (2013). In 2020, he appeared in Bela Shuru, a family drama film directed by Nandita Roy. In 2021 he has completed 7 years of his acting career.

Filmography and television

Films

Television

Reality show

Music video

Web series

Awards

In the media
Chakraborty entered Times Of India's Most Desirable Men of 2020 at 10th position.

References

External links 
 
 

Living people
Indian male television actors
1994 births
Male actors in Bengali cinema
Bengali male actors
Bengali male television actors
21st-century Indian male actors
Bengali actors
Indian actors
Indian television actors
+Male
Kolkata
Male actors from West Bengal